Kill Your Darlings is a 2006 film directed by Björne Larson and written by Björne Larson and Johan Sandström. In an interview with Svenska Dagbladet, Larson said that the film is based on a real event in his life when he met a seemingly nice man at an internet cafe in Los Angeles who ended up leaving Larson bound and restrained in a desert. The film features a cast of many of the most popular contemporary Swedish actors (Fares Fares, father and son Stellan and Alexander Skarsgård, and Andreas Wilson from Oscar-nominated Evil) and some less famous U.S. actors Julie Benz and Greg Germann, and Canadian Lolita Davidovitch.

The title seems to be a reference to the popular advice for writers, "Murder your darlings," commonly misattributed but written by Sir Arthur Quiller-Couch.

Cast
Lolita Davidovich as Lola
Andreas Wilson as Erik
Fares Fares as Omar
Alexander Skarsgård as Geert
Julie Benz as Katherine
John Larroquette as Dr. Bangley
Greg Germann as Stevens
Benito Martinez as Officer Jones
John Savage as Rock
Terry Moore as Ella Toscana
Skye McCole Bartusiak as Sunshine
Michelle Bonilla as Susan (as Michelle C. Bonilla)
Scott Williamson as Rob Wolfton
Ashlyn Sanchez as Meadow
Michael Cutt as Lou (as Michael J. Cutt)
Stellan Skarsgård as Erik's Father

See also
Peter Hansen Gibson
Gudrun Giddings

References

External links

Swedish comedy-drama films
2006 films
2006 comedy-drama films
2000s Swedish-language films
2000s Swedish films